Phyu Phyu Kyaw Thein is a Burmese pop singer, known for her stage presence and costumes, which have drawn comparisons to Lady Gaga. She has been a UNICEF celebrity ambassador since 2008.

Early life and education
Phyu Phyu Kyaw Thein was born in Rangoon, Burma (now Yangon, Myanmar), on 22 April 1981 to Kyaw Thein, a ranking civil servant at the Ministry of Cooperatives, and his wife, Tin Tin Kyi, a lecturer at the Yangon University of Economics. She has an elder sister, Nyo Nyo Thein, who was born 7 years earlier.

She is a physician by training; she graduated from the University of Medicine 1, Yangon.

Career 
Phyu Phyu Kyaw Thein debuted in 2003 with the album Not Concerned Anymore. She joined the 2019 season of Myanmar Idol as a judge. She serves as a secretary for the Myanmar Music Association.

Political activities
Following the 2021 Myanmar coup d'état, she participated in the anti-coup movement both in person at rallies and through social media. Denouncing the military coup, she took part in protests, starting in February. She joined the "We Want Justice" three-finger salute movement. The movement was launched on social media, and many celebrities have joined the movement.

On 13 April 2021, warrants for her arrest were issued under Section 505 (a) of the Myanmar Penal Code by the State Administration Council for speaking out against the military coup. Along with several other celebrities, she was charged with calling for participation in the Civil Disobedience Movement (CDM) and damaging the state's ability to govern, with supporting the Committee Representing Pyidaungsu Hluttaw, and with generally inciting the people to disturb the peace and stability of the nation.

Discography

 Not Concerned Anymore (2003)
 The Curse of Love (2007)
 Memoir of a Diva (2011)
 Damsel in Distress (2013)
 Thou Shalt Be Remembered (2015)
 April Fool (mini-album) (2016)
 Storm (mini-album) (2018)

Awards and nominations

City FM awards 

|-
| 2008
| Phyu Phyu Kyaw Thein
| Best Selling Studio Music Album Female Vocalist of the Year 
| 
|-

Shwe FM awards

|-
| 2013
| Damsel in Distress
| Best album
| 
|-

Joox Myanmar Music awards

|-
| 2020
| Just Go Away(ထွက်သွားပါတော့)
| Popular Song Award
| 
|-

References

21st-century Burmese women singers
Living people
21st-century Burmese physicians
Burmese women physicians
1981 births
University of Medicine 1, Yangon alumni
People from Yangon
Burmese Christians